Yoko Mori (森瑤子) (November 4, 1940  July 6, 1993) was a Japanese novelist, essayist, and translator who was known for writing popular romantic fiction. Her real name was Masayo Brackin ( Ito).

Biography 
Mori was born Masayo Ito in Shizuoka, Japan on November 4, 1940. Shortly after she was born, she and her parents moved to Inner Mongolia. Her father worked there throughout World War II. When the war ended, they returned to Japan and lived in Tokyo. She studied violin, and enjoyed Western films and novels, especially the works of Francois Sagan, who her works were later compared with. She graduated from Tokyo University of the Arts in 1961. However, instead of becoming a professional violinist, she ended up working for an advertising firm. She married an Englishman named Ivan Brackin in 1964 and raised three children with him.

Mori began writing in 1978. Her first story, Joji (情事), won the Subaru Literary Award. She also wrote essays about her life and international travel. She wrote prolifically until she died of cancer on July 6, 1993.

Style 
Mori usually wrote about boring or unhappy marriages and middle-aged women rebelling against them by having affairs. There were very rarely happy endings, and after their affairs the protagonists typically found themselves in the same position as when the story began. Her stories were compared to Harlequin romances, gothic novels, and American soap operas. Her popularity came from an excellent understanding of social conditions in Japan during the 1980s, and she used that to write stories that fulfilled women's fantasies. For that reason, her novels were very popular.

Selected bibliography

Short story collections 

 Joji (情事), 1978
 Yuwaku (誘惑), 1980
 Beddo no otogibanashi (ベッドのおとぎばなし), 1986
 Tuinkuru monogatari (トウィンクル物語), 1992

Novels 

Dezato wa anata (デザートはあなた), 1991
Yogoto no yurikago, fune, aruiwa senjo (夜ごとの揺り籠、舟、あるいは戦場), 1986

Translations 

 Scarlett by Alexandra Ripley, 1992.

References 

1940 births
1993 deaths
Japanese women novelists

People from Shizuoka Prefecture
Tokyo University of the Arts alumni